Pablo Nicolás Caballero Santos (born 21 July 1986) is an Argentine footballer who plays as a forward for Italian Serie D club FC Messina.

Club career
Born in Totoras, Santa Fe, Caballero graduated from Racing Club de Avellaneda's youth setup. He made his professional debut on 24 November 2007, starting in a 0–0 home draw against Independiente for the Primera División championship.

Caballero scored his first professional goal on 28 September 2008, netting his side's last in a 3–3 away draw against River Plate. He appeared in 29 matches during the campaign, scoring three goals.

On 26 July 2010 Caballero was loaned to Tigre. After another temporary spell at Guaraní, he returned to Racing, but only appeared sparingly.

In the 2012 summer Caballero moved to Primera B Nacional's Almirante Brown. After appearing and scoring regularly, he moved to Chinese Super League side Qingdao Jonoon on 23 July 2013.

In January 2014 Caballero returned to his home country, signing for Ferro Carril Oeste. On 30 January 2015 he joined Spanish Segunda División side CD Lugo.

On 17 July 2017, free agent Caballero signed a two-year contract with UD Almería still in the second tier.

After a season with FC Cartagena, he moved to Italy in October 2020 to join Serie D club FC Messina.

References

External links

1986 births
Living people
People from Iriondo Department
Argentine footballers
Association football forwards
Argentine Primera División players
Primera Nacional players
Racing Club de Avellaneda footballers
Club Atlético Tigre footballers
Ferro Carril Oeste footballers
Paraguayan Primera División players
Club Guaraní players
Chinese Super League players
Qingdao Hainiu F.C. (1990) players
Segunda División players
CD Lugo players
UD Almería players
FC Cartagena footballers
Argentine expatriate footballers
Argentine expatriate sportspeople in Paraguay
Expatriate footballers in Paraguay
Expatriate footballers in China
Argentine expatriate sportspeople in Spain
Expatriate footballers in Spain
CD Tudelano footballers
Primera Federación players
Sportspeople from Santa Fe Province